Meynardo Asa Sabili

Dubbed as "Ama ng Direktang Serbisyo," Hon. Meynard A. Sabili is dedicated, and multi-awarded Mayor of Lipa City fo nine consecutive years (2010-2019). He is an advocate of servant leadership, innovations, and community empowerment. During his tenure in office, he turned his 7-point agenda "IHELP" into reality as manifested in the improvements in infrastructure, information and communication technology (ICT), health, education, environment, livelihood, and peace and order. Because of his compassonate, competent, and committed discharge of duties as Mayor, he became the recipient of various local and international awards, most notable of which was the Most Outstanding Mayor of the Philippines for Social Services Award. He is a hall of famer for being consistent in receiving Super Brands Marketing International (SMI) Outstanding Mayor Award. His humble beginnings did not deter him from excelling academically. He obtained his Bachelor of Arts major in Political Science degree from the University of Santo Tomas; Bachelor of Laws degree from the Ateneo de Manila University; Master of Laws from the Graduate School of Law, University of Santo Tomas, (Magna Cum Laude, and Class Valedictorian); Masters of Public Security and administration from the Philippine Public Safety college. He is currently a candidate for Doctor of Laws, University of Santo Tomas. Because of his exemplary record as a public servant, philanthropic, contributiona to Philippine society (local and national), advocacies, and excellent academic performance, he was recognized by colleges and universities overseas: He was conferred with Doctor of Laws Honoris Causa, by the International University of Studies and Research in Algeria; Doctor of Humanities, Honoris Causa by the United College of Brazil; and Doctor of Public Administration, Honoris Causa by St. James University and Seminary. Pennsylvania. United States of America. The same university awarded him with Most Outstanding Filipino Public Official and Servant Leader.

After his 9 years in the office as Lipa City Mayor, he was appointed as Undersecretary of the Department of Human Settlements and Urban Development. Sabili is married to Bernadette Sabili.

References

Living people
1957 births
Independent politicians in the Philippines
Mayors of places in Batangas
Members of the Batangas Provincial Board
People from Lipa, Batangas

https://www.facebook.com/MeynardASabiliOFFICIAL